Michael John Montgomery (born February 27, 1947) is a retired American basketball coach. He is best known for his 18-year tenure at Stanford (1986–2004), where he led the program to 12 NCAA Tournaments, including a Final Four appearance in 1998. Montgomery previously served as head coach at the Montana (1978–1986). Following his time at Stanford, he coached the Golden State Warriors of the National Basketball Association (NBA) for two seasons (2004–2006) before ending his career at the University of California (2008–2014). He announced his retirement from coaching following the 2013–14 season.

Over his 32-year collegiate coaching career, Montgomery made 16 NCAA Tournaments, captured 6 conference championships, and amassed nearly 700 victories. He also led Stanford to the NIT championship in 1991.

Early years
Born and raised in Long Beach, California, Montgomery graduated from its Millikan High School and attended Long Beach State. He received a Bachelor of Arts degree in physical education from Long Beach State and later a Master's degree in physical education from Colorado State University in Fort Collins. Montgomery is an alumni member of Sigma Alpha Epsilon fraternity, which he joined while at Long Beach State.

College coaching career
Montgomery compiled a 677–317 overall record in over 30 years at Berkeley (2008-2014), Stanford (1986–2004) and Montana (1978–1986). He boasts 31 winning seasons in his 32 years as a head coach at Berkeley, Stanford and Montana. Montgomery's Stanford teams reached the NCAA tournament ten straight times from 1995 to 2004. Stanford reached the Final Four under Montgomery in 1998, the school's first Final Four appearance in 56 years.
He made his third appearance along the USA Basketball sidelines in 2002 when he was named an assistant under George Karl for the US national team in the 2002 FIBA World Championship.

Prior to being named head coach at Montana in 1978, he was an assistant for the Grizz in Missoula for two seasons under new head coach Jim Brandenburg, who succeeded hall of famer Jud Heathcote in 1976. Brandenburg left after two season for Wyoming in 1978 and Montgomery was promoted. At Montana, Montgomery coached future NBA players Micheal Ray Richardson and Larry Krystkowiak.  Prior to Montana, Montgomery was an assistant for three years at Boise State under Bus Connor, and had previously been an assistant for a season each at four different schools.

In 2000, Montgomery was named the Naismith and Basketball Times Coach of the Year. He was also named the Pac-10 Coach of the Year four times. Following his career at Stanford, he was awarded the John R. Wooden Legends of Coaching Lifetime Achievement Award.

On August 30, 2007, Stanford University announced that Montgomery was returning to the university as Assistant to the Athletic Director on a part-time basis.  According to the announcement, "his duties will include fund raising and public relations while also serving as a mentor to Stanford's coaching staff."

On April 4, 2008, Montgomery was named the head coach of the California men's basketball program. In his first season the Golden Bears went 22–10 and made it to the NCAA tournament, where they lost in the first round to Maryland.

On February 27, 2010, Cal defeated Arizona State, 62–46, to clinch at least a tie for the Pacific-10 Conference championship, the first for the school since 1960. On March 6, the Bears defeated Montgomery's former team, Stanford, 71–61, to clinch an undisputed conference championship. Cal was defeated by Washington in the finals of the Pac-10 tournament, but received a bid to the NCAA tournament, where they were seeded 8th in the South Region. The Bears advanced to the second round, where they were defeated by eventual National Champion Duke.

On March 31, 2014, Montgomery announced his retirement from California.

NBA coaching career
Montgomery left Stanford to become the head coach of the Golden State Warriors on May 21, 2004.  He coached the Warriors for two seasons, during each of which the team compiled identical 34-48 records.  Montgomery was terminated as Warriors coach on August 29, 2006.

Personal
In October 2011, Montgomery revealed that he had recently been diagnosed and treated for bladder cancer.  After a surgical procedure was performed, Montgomery declared himself "cancer-free.

On February 18, 2013, Coach Montgomery was reprimanded by the Pac-12 Conference for shoving one of his players in the chest during a game against USC. The conference did not announce what punishment Montgomery received for his actions, although he was not suspended. Commissioner Larry Scott commented, "While emotions can run high in competitive environments, Pac-12 coaches are expected to conduct themselves in a manner that will reflect credit on the institution and the conference."

Montgomery and his wife Sara have two adult children; son John is an assistant coach at Hawaii.

Head coaching record

College

NBA

|-
| style="text-align:left;"|Golden State
| style="text-align:left;"|
|82||34||48|||| style="text-align:center;"|5th in Pacific||—||—||—||—
| style="text-align:center;"|Missed playoffs
|-
| style="text-align:left;"|Golden State
| style="text-align:left;"|
|82||34||48|||| style="text-align:center;"|5th in Pacific||—||—||—||—
| style="text-align:center;"|Missed playoffs
|- class="sortbottom"
| style="text-align:left;"|Career
| ||164||68||96|||| ||—||—||—||—

See also
 List of college men's basketball coaches with 600 wins
 List of NCAA Division I Men's Final Four appearances by coach

References

External links

 NBA profile
 Sports-Reference – Mike Montgomery – college
 Basketball-Reference – Mike Montgomery – NBA

1947 births
Living people
American men's basketball coaches
American men's basketball players
Basketball coaches from California
Basketball players from Long Beach, California
Boise State Broncos men's basketball coaches
California Golden Bears men's basketball coaches
Coast Guard Bears men's basketball coaches
College men's basketball head coaches in the United States
Colorado State Rams men's basketball coaches
Florida Gators men's basketball coaches
Golden State Warriors head coaches
Long Beach State Beach men's basketball players
Millikan High School alumni
Montana Grizzlies basketball coaches
Sportspeople from Long Beach, California
Stanford Cardinal men's basketball coaches
The Citadel Bulldogs basketball coaches